Aspergillus duricaulis is a species of fungus in the genus Aspergillus. It is from the Fumigati section. The species was first described in 1965. It has been reported to produce pseurotin A, fumagillin, asperpentyn, duricaulic acid, asperdurin, phthalides, chromanols, cyclopaldic acid, and 3-O-methylcyclopolic acid.

Growth and morphology

A. duricaulis has been cultivated on both Czapek yeast extract agar (CYA) plates and Malt Extract Agar Oxoid® (MEAOX) plates. The growth morphology of the colonies can be seen in the pictures below.

References 

duricaulis
Fungi described in 1965